The Verville VCP was an American single-engined biplane fighter aircraft of the 1920s. A single example of the VCP-1 was built by the United States Army Air Service's Engineering Division, which was later rebuilt into a successful racing aircraft, while a second, modified fighter was built as the PW-1.

Design and development

VCP-1
In 1918, Virginius E. Clark, in charge of the Plane Design section of the U.S. Army Air Service's Engineering Division and Alfred V. Verville, who had recently joined the Engineering Division from private industry, started design of a single-seat fighter (known as "pursuit" aircraft to the U.S. Army), the VCP-1 (Verville-Clark Pursuit).

Drawing from the experience of the French and their SPAD S.XIII, the desire was to make a sleeker and more maneuverable fighter. The VCP-1 was powered by a Wright-built  Hispano-Suiza 8 V-8 engine and had tapered single-bay biplane wings. The fuselage was a monocoque structure constructed of plywood, while the wings were of wood and fabric construction. The engine was cooled with an unusual annular radiator.

Two were built, but only one was flown, making its maiden flight on June 11, 1920. The aircraft demonstrated good performance, reaching , but the radical annular radiator was unsuccessful, having to be replaced to a more conventional unit. Because of its performance, it was decided to modify the VCP-1 to a racing aircraft, replacing the Wright-Hispano engine with a  Packard 1A-2025 V12 engine, becoming the VCP-R (later again rebuilt as the Verville R-1 Racer).

PW-1
In 1920, work commenced on two new fighter aircraft based on the VCP-1, featuring an easier to build fabric covered steel-tube fuselage instead of the plywood monocoque of the VCP-1. The aircraft retained the tapered wings of the VCP-1 and was powered by a  Packard 1A-1237 engine, cooled by a tunnel-style radiator located under the engine.
 
The new design was initially known as the VCP-2, but was soon redesignated as PW-1 (Pursuit, Water-Cooled) in the U.S. Army Air Service's new designation system. It was rebuilt later that year with a new untapered set of wings using a Fokker style thick airfoil, becoming the PW-1A, but performance was reduced, and the aircraft was refitted with its original wings, reverting to the designation PW-1.

While plans were prepared for more powerful versions fitted with revised wings, no production ensued.

Operational history
The VCP-R made its racing debut at the 1920 Gordon Bennett Cup race held at Étampes near Paris on 28 September. Its radiator proved to be insufficient to deal with the powerful, high-compression Packard engine, however, and it retired after the first lap. It was taken back to the U.S. and quickly modified with a larger radiator for entry in the Pulitzer Trophy air-race, held at Mineola, New York on 25 November that year.

The U.S. Armed Forces did not compete in the 1921 Pulitzer Trophy race, but for the 1922 race the VCP-R was fitted with a revised tail, becoming the R-1.

Variants
VCP-1
Single-seat biplane fighter, powered by 300 hp Wright-Hispano engine. Two built, one flown.
VCP-R
R-1
Modification of VCP-R for 1922 Pulitzer Trophy race. Maximum speed .
PW-1
Modified fighter aircraft with steel-tube fuselage and 350 hp Packard 1A-1237 engine. Two built but only one flown.
PW-1A
PW-1 fitted with new, Fokker-style wings.

Specifications (PW-1)

See also

References
Notes

Bibliography

Angelucci, Enzo and Peter M. Bowers. The American Fighter. Sparkford, UK:Haynes Publishing Group, 1987. .
Boyne, Walter J. "The Treasures of McCook Field: America's First Aero Engineering and Testing Centre, Part 1". The Best of Wings Magazine. Washington DC:Brassey's, 2001. pp. 1–9. .
Boyne, Walter J. "The Treasures of McCook Field: America's First Aero Engineering and Testing Centre, Part 2". The Best of Wings Magazine. Washington DC:Brassey's, 2001. pp. 10–18. .
Dorr, Robert F. and David Donald. Fighters of the United States Air Force. London:Temple Press/Aerospace, 1990. .
"Gordon-Bennett 1920: The Cup Goes to France". Flight, 7 October 1920. pp. 1055–1059.
Green, William and Gordon Swanborough. The Complete Book of Fighters. New York: Smithmark, 1994. .
"Reports and Memoranda: The Pulitzer Trophy Race". Flight, 2 December 1920, p. 1244.
"The 1922 Pulitzer Trophy Race". Flight, 19 October 1922, pp. 603–605.
"The Second Annual Pulitzer Race at Omaha". Flight, 1 December 1921, p. 805.

External links
 
 http://www.americancombatplanes.com/biplane_army_1.html

1920s United States fighter aircraft
VCP
Engineering Division aircraft
Single-engined tractor aircraft
Biplanes
Aircraft first flown in 1920